is a Japanese freelance announcer and tarento who is a former Tokyo Broadcasting System Television announcer.

Early life to school days
Tanaka was born in New York City, U.S. on 23 November 1986. Because she was born in the U.S. she was given the middle name of Amy.  She was moved to Japan soon after her birth, but after her first year in elementary school she lived in London and San Francisco before returning to Japan for junior high school.

She attended the Aoyama Gakuin University Department of English Literature. She also played tennis while at the university.  It is said that she was interested in announcer 's work as Ayaka Ogawa, a senior who was longing for Madonna—like her existence of the circle, she announced to become an announcer. She also worked as a model for fashion magazines and posters. In 2007, she participated in the "Miss Aoyama Contest 2007" and became Semi-Miss.

As a TBS announcer 2009
After graduating in English Literature from Aoyama Gakuin University she joined TBS Television.

On 7 April, she joined synchronised with AnaCan and made her announcing debuts with Ai Eto. On 12 April, they introduced themselves with a nationwide broadcast at Akko no omakase!, introducing herself with Eto. From the beginning she wrote her blog in the AnaCan official website but closed due to the end of the programme. After that she started another blog (her current blog).

She debuted as a female customer of the film Professor Layton and the Eternal Diva released in the same year as a voice actress.

She made her first appearance on Sunday Japon on 11 October. She went to climbing location in Mount Tsukuba with Hideki Yamanaka, and announcers Yuko Aoki and Mai Demizu. Although she had appeared irregularly afterwards in SunJapo, she was in charge as a reporter at the information corner in the programme "Jōhō Live Minami-ya" which was converted into a corner from 12 September.

She would be in charge of Academy Night from 16 October. In the spring of 2014 it was the longest serving regular in charge of the program (until October 2013).

2010
She appeared as a female employee (assistant) at Tokyo Friend Park 2 from 29 March. She appeared until it ended in March 2011 (the final episode). She later became Mami Yamasaki no Sunday Good Support assistant from October 2010.

2011
From April, she was in charge of Risa Yoshiki no Enjoy Driving Sunday as assistant.

From 2 April, she would be in charge of assistance of Saturday Zubatto. She was originally scheduled until the morning absence of Ayu Yamanouchi, three years until the final episode on 29 March 2014.

On 25 June, she appeared in the TBS announcer recitation meeting The Little Prince held at the Museum of The Little Prince in Hakone and would play the role of the Rose.

She appeared on the film Fullmetal Alchemist: The Sacred Star of Milos released on 2 July as an announcer in the Resembool Station.

She later appeared in Nippon! Ijiru Z for a year and a half since 12 October. As foreign girl Amy, along with Koji Higashino (Leader Gomez) and Takashi Fujii (foreign boy Peter), they travelled all over Japan every week.

2012
She became assistant at the HIV/AIDS enlightenment event Red Ribbon Live 2012 Red Ribbon Dai Sakusen! –Anata wa HIV/AIDS Kensa ni Ikimasu ka?–' of DJ Shoo Yamamoto's comprehensive production held at Diversity Tokyo on 2 June.

She played the brand new pilot who operates the "No. 3D-BooBo" at the "3D-BooBo Tours" which is the eyeball of "Natsu Sacas 2012 –Egao no Tobira–" attraction at Akasaka Sacas from 21 July to 2 September.

2013
From 6 January, she was promoted as the moderator of SunJapo. In addition, she appeared in Toho film Kodomo Keisatsu released on 20 March.
2014
On 25 June, she announced on her blog that she would "retire TBS on 30th September 2014 and become a freelance announcer."

As a freelance announcer
After retiring from TBS, she belongs to the entertainment office TakeOff, which also includes Seiji Miyane and Shinichi Hatori. She continuously appeared on TBS TV's Ariyoshi Japon and Job Tune Ano Shokugyō no Himitsu butcha kemasu! and TBS Radio's Minami Tanaka Attaka Time and Job Tune R, and on 26 October she would make regular appearances for the first time on a station that is not from TBS at Fuji TV's News na Bansan-kai.

2016
She served as the main MC at Tokyo MX's information programme Hirukyun!, which started on 3 October. Tanaka would become the first regular in the daytime programme as one of the first MC in the information programme.

Personal life

She has older siblings.

Her synchronous announcer Ai Eto is a student enrolled in the same university, undergraduate, department, seminar, Miss Aoyama Contest's Semi-Miss (Eto in 2006), student enrolment at the TBS Announcement School and so on.

Currently appearing programmes

Television
Ariyoshi Japon (TBS, 13 Jul, 10 Oct 2012 mid-morning–) MC, from TBS era
Job Tune Ano Shokugyō no Himitsu butcha kemasu! (TBS, 2 Feb 2013 –) MC, from TBS era
Shinobu Sakagami no Kata sete agetai TV (NTV, 5 May 2016 –) progress
Azatokute Nani ga Warui no? (TV Asahi, 27 September 2019 –) MC

Radio
Minami Tanaka Attaka Time (TBS Radio, 3 Jan 2012 –)

Former appearances and works

After leaving TBS

Television
News na Bansan-kai (Fuji TV, Oct 2014 – Aug 2015) MC
Jinmei Variety Atsumare Tanaka! (NHK G, 23 Sep 2015)
4-koma Conte Kishōtenketsu (NTV, 14 Oct mid-morning – 30 Dec 2015 mid-morning (Tue midnight)) MC
Chimata no Real TV Coming Out! (Fuji TV, 16 Oct 2015 – 18 Mar 2016) MC
Answers by fashion tv (BS Fuji, 8 Oct 2015 – 24 Mar 2016) narration
Shiawase Tsuikyū Variety Kinyōbi no Kikitai Onna-tachi (Fuji TV, Apr–Aug 2016) progress
Job Tune R (TBS Radio, 6 Apr 2013 – 31 Dec 2016)
Chotto Zawatsuku Image Chōsa Moshikashite Zure teru? (KTV, Fuji TV, 23 Jan – 25 Dec 2017) MC
Hirukyun! (Tokyo MX, 3 Oct 2016 – 29 Mar 2019) MC

Dramas 
 Zettai Seigi (THK, 2 Feb – 23 Mar 2019) – as Reika Ishimori
 Lupin no Musume (Fuji TV, 8 Aug 2019) – as Miwa Futaba
 Motokare Mania (Fuji TV, 17 Oct 2019 – ) – as Mugi Kurusu
 M: Beloved One (TV Asahi, 2020) - as Reika Himeno
 North Light (NHK, 2020)
 Even If You Don't Do It (Fuji TV, 2023) – as Kaede Niina

Films 
Masquerade Night (2021) – as Kumiko Akiyama
Will I Be Single Forever? (2021) – as Mami Honda
 Ichikei's Crow: The Movie (2023) – as Kanako Shimatani

Radio 
 antenna*Tokyo Ongoing (Tokyo FM, 30 Apr 2016 – 30 Mar 2018)

Dubbing
Doctor Strange (2017) – as the worrying doctor (Elizabeth Healey)
Godzilla vs. Kong (2021) – as Maia Simmons (Eiza González)

Advertisements
Eneos "Newscaster Suiso"-hen (Oct 2015 –)
KDDI "Ariyoshi Jaoin-au Bar Minami" (Nov 2015 – Mar 2016)
Sapporo Breweries "Chu-hai Relax" (2018)
Open House "Yumemiru Sho-gakusei Hoken Shitsu" (2019)
Peach John "Miracle Bra" (2021)

TBS era

Television
Regular appearances
AnaCan (7 Apr – 22 Sep 2009)
Academy Night (16 Oct 2009 – 10 Oct 2013)*Then broadcast on Thursday late night
Evening Wide (8 Jan – 26 Mar 2010) – Friday advanced caster
Tokyo Friend Park 2 (29 Mar 2010 – 28 Mar 2011 (Final episode, closed day)) – Employee
N Sta (1 Apr 2010 – 1 Apr 2011) – "N Ten," "Enta horikomi'" Every Thursday/Friday
JNN Flash News – Fridays
King of Chair (20 Jul, 11 Oct 2010 – 1 Jan 2011)
Sunday Japon (Progress-SunJapo journalist-"Jōhō Live Minami-ya" corner reporter/12 Sep 2010 – 28 Sep 2014)
Saturday Zubatto. (2 Apr 2011 – 29 Mar 2014)
JNN News
Sanma no Super Karakuri TV –
"Buri-kko Joshi-ana Minami Tanaka vs Shizuchan" series (VTR appearances)
"Sanma Ukiuki O-ten Hōmon" (broadcast 8 May 2011), etc.
Nippon! Ijiru Z (13 Oct 2011 (12th late night) – 21 Mar 2013 (20th late night))
SataNepu Best Ten (15 Oct 2011 – 1 Sep 2012)
Bakuhō! The Friday (21 Oct 2011 – 19 Sep 2014)
TBS News Bird (CS, around Nov 2011 – Sep 2012) – Every other Tuesday late night
Joshi-ana no Batsu (Occasional appearances/16 Jul 2012 – 26 Mar 2014)
Wedding Stage–Minna ga Shuyaku Wedding (narration/1 Oct 2013 – Sep 2014)

Irregular, single appearance, etc.
All-Star Thanksgiving '09 Autumn (3 Oct 2009) – Reporter
Announced! The 42nd Japan Cable Awards (20 Oct 2009) – Moderator
Doors 2009 Gentō (28 Dec 2009) – Reporter
Minakami no Chōsen-sha Special Eikō to Zasetsu no Yume Butai! Dai 45-kai SG Sōri Daijin-hai (22 Mar 2010) – Pit reporter of race boat relay
Ai to Ikari no Gekihaku SP Konna Otoko Yame chaina Kuzumen Bokumetsu Iinkai! (13 Apr 2010) – Moderator
Zenbu. (Apr–Sep 2010)
King's Brunch (26 Jun 2010) – Apprentice as regular with Erina Masuda because regular Mai Demizu was absent on duty
Hiroki Ando-Minami Tanaka no Iriomotejima Adventure Kikō (CS TBS Channel, initial broadcast 28 Aug 2010)
Hiruobi! (8, 9 Sep 2010) – Appeared as a substitute for Hiroko Ogura at the time of summer vacation
52nd Japan Record Awards (30 Dec 2010) – Moderator
CDTV Special Toshikoshi Premier Live 2010→2011 (31 Dec 2010 – 1 Jan 2011) – Moderator and reporter
Sanma no Honto no Koi no Kamasawagi (13 Apr, 23 Aug 2011 broadcast) – Guest appearance
Dai Hit no Ano Hon! Tameshite mimasu (9 Jul 2011 broadcast)
Pittanko Kan Kan Special (14 Oct 2011 broadcast)
Sanma Akashiya ga Honki de asu ni demo Sumitai Machi o Sagasu Tabi – Narration
in Hawaii (3 Dec 2011 broadcast)
in New Zealand (26 Jan 2014 broadcast)
KAT-TUN no Sekaiichi Damena Yoru! (occasional appearances/Aug–Dec 2012)
Dai Enjō-sei TV Ore ni mo Iwa sero! (28 Sep 2012 broadcast)
Tsuini Kaikin! Chō Taikan Attraction Dekita! (7 Oct 2012 broadcast)
TBS Wakate Director to Ishibashi no Doyō no 3-kai (occasional appearances/Oct 2012 broadcast)
Morning Chance (28 Aug 2014) – as a substitute MC for Miku Natsume

Dramas
Keigo Higashino Mystery Shinshun Drama Tokubetsu Kikaku Akai Yubi "Shinsanmono" Kyoichiro Futabi Futatabi! (3 Jan 2011) – as Kuzumochiya vendor
Fuyu no Sakura (16 Jan 2011) – as Nurse
Ikemen desu ne (15 Jul 2011) – as Welcome party female customer
Miyuki Miyabe 4-Shū Renzoku "Gokujō" Mystery 2nd Night The Hunting of the Snark (14 May 2012) – as Wedding ceremony moderator
Papadol! (28 Jun 2012)

Radio
Battle Talk Radio Access Uchi Radio News (14 Sep, 1 Oct 2009)
Yuri Osawa no YuYu Wide
Asa 8-Jidai no Radio News (15 Sep, 2, 7 Oct 2009 – Mar 2010) – Mainly on Wednesdays
Saturday Sports Manager (10 Oct 2009 – 3 Apr 2010)
Bakushō Mondai no Nichiyō Sunday (3 Jan, 30 May, 29 Aug 2010)
Moe Murakami no Cutie Party (4 Oct – 30 Dec 2010) – Assistant
Mami Yamasaki no Good Support Friday (10 Oct 2010 – 3 Apr 2011) – Assistant
Risa Yoshiki no Enjoy Driving Sunday (10 Apr – 26 Jun 2011)

Magazines
Weekly Playboy No. 15 (6 Apr 2009) – "Omedetō-ana Saku Sotsugyō" Two-shot with synchronous Ai Eto
Big Comic Spirits No.10 (No. 20 Feb 2012) – Top gravure
Weekly Playboy (Release No. 8 May 2011 – Sep 2014) Minami Tanaka no Minamin Minzemi – Serialisation
Beautiful Lady & Television Minami Tanaka no Minahappy BLT-ban – Serialisation

Films
Kodomo Keisatsu (Toho, 2013)

Webcasts
TBS Female Announcement Division Minami Tanaka Announcer no Oshigoto (1 Jul 2010–12, 70 times in total

Activities before joining TBS

Magazines
Weekly Young Jump No. 45 (23 Oct 2008) – Gravure

Films
Short film Marianne no Maisō (New Cinema Works, 2004) – as Minatsu

See also
List of Japanese announcers

References

Citations

External links
 
Minami Tanaka blog – Miss Aoyama Gakuin contest 2007 candidate's blog 
Miss Colle – Historic Miss Interview · Near Miss Aoyama 2007 Minami Tanaka 
Minami Tanaka-Sensei no Nikki 

Japanese announcers
Japanese television personalities
Japanese television presenters
Japanese women television presenters
Aoyama Gakuin University alumni
People from Saitama Prefecture
Television personalities from New York City
1986 births
Living people